Daryl Turner is a former professional American football player that played wide receiver for the Seattle Seahawks in the National Football League for four years. He played college football for the Michigan State Spartans.

Early life
Turner attended Flint Southwestern High School, now known as Flint Southwestern Academy.

College Statistics
1980: 11 catches for 236 yards and 2 TD.
1981: 31 catches for 653 yards and 4 TD.
1982: 8 catches for 139 yards and 2 TD.
1983: 28 catches for 549 yards and 5 TD. 3 carries for 5 yards.

NFL career
Turner set three franchise records for the Seattle Seahawks for highest yard average per-catch in a career (18.53),  most receiving touchdowns in a season (13), and most receiving touchdowns for a rookie (10). He amassed 23 touchdowns on 69 receptions over his first two seasons in the NFL. Turner's production declined in his next two seasons, which he attributed to alcohol and drug abuse. The Seahawks attempted to trade Turner to the Cleveland Browns for an undisclosed draft pick after the 1987 NFL season. The trade was voided after Turner failed a physical examination and the Seahawks released him. Turner subsequently entered a drug rehabilitation program. The San Francisco 49ers offered Turner a tryout before the 1988 NFL season, but he failed to secure a roster spot.

References 

1961 births
Living people
American football wide receivers
Michigan State Spartans football players
Seattle Seahawks players
People from Wadley, Georgia
Players of American football from Georgia (U.S. state)